José María (abbreviated José Mª) is a Spanish language male given name, usually considered a single given name rather than two names, and is a combination of the Spanish names of Joseph and Mary, the parents of Jesus Christ. The separate names "José" for males and "María" for females also exist in the Spanish language. They can also combine in the inverse order forming the female name "María José" (Mª José); that is, the gender of the compound names "José María" and "María José" is determined by their first component. The name "José María" is colloquially shortened to "José Mari", "Josema" or replaced by the hypocoristic forms "Chema", "Chemari" or "Chemis".

There are also combinations of other male given names with María, for example Carlos María, Juan María and Luis María.

"José María", with its Portuguese language equivalent José Maria (notice the absence of the acute accent over the i in the Portuguese version) is a common name, and many famous people have the name or a similar one.

Spanish names
José María de Achá, President of Bolivia from 1861 to 1864
José María Amorrortu, Spanish football player and manager
José María Aznar, President of the Government of Spain from 1996 to 2004
José María Barreda, President of the Spanish autonomous region of Castile-La Mancha
José María Callejón (born 1987), Spanish football (soccer) player
Jose Mari Chan, Filipino-Chinese singer, songwriter, TV personality, and businessman in the sugar industry, born 1945
Josemaría Escrivá, Spanish Catholic priest - founder of Opus Dei
José María Franco, Uruguayan footballer
José María García Lafuente, commonly known as "José Mari": Spanish footballer, born 1971
Jose Mari Gonzales, Filipino actor
José María Gutiérrez, commonly known as "Guti": Spanish footballer
José María Hernández, Spanish politician
José María Linares, President of Bolivia from 1857 to 1861
José María Martín Bejarano-Serrano, commonly known as "José Mari": Spanish footballer, born 1987
José María Morelos, Mexican revolutionary
José María Napoleón, Mexican singer and songwriter, born 1950
José María Olazábal, Spanish golfer, born 1966
José María Romero Poyón, commonly known as "José Mari": Spanish footballer, born 1978
José María Ruiz Mateos, Spanish businessman and former politician
Jose Maria Sison, Filipino activist, professor, writer, political thinker, founder of the Communist Party of the Philippines, adherent of Maoism, born in 1939 and died in 2022. 
José María Zárraga, Spanish international footballer

Portuguese names
Miguel Boaventura Lucena, known as "José Maria de Santo Agostinho" or simply "José Maria": a mystic leader in the Contestado War in Brazil
José Maria Marin, Brazilian politician
José Maria Rodrigues Alves, nicknamed "Zé Maria": retired Brazilian footballer

See also

Zé Maria

References

Spanish masculine given names